Bellerophon (Bellerophōn) is an ancient Greek tragedy written by Euripides, based upon the myth of Bellerophon. Most of the play was lost by the end of the Antiquity, and only 90 verses, grouped into 29 fragments, currently survive.

Plot
Given the fragmentary state of this tragedy, the plot remains open to conjecture. Most modern critics nevertheless agree on the following storyline.

The play apparently began with Bellerophon riding his horse Pegasus carried in the air by the crane.

Bellerophon, who seems to have lost everything, lives on an uncultivated land with his father Glaucos and Pegasus. Deeply pessimistic about his condition, Bellerophon eventually believes the gods do not exist.

He subsequently decides to reach Mount Olympus, thanks to Pegasus's flying abilities. The motives of such an ascent have remained unclear. Regardless, Pegasus falls with his rider and the wounded Bellerophon is brought to the stage. Having repented for his blasphemous behaviour, Bellerophon dies.

References

Translations
 Euripide, Tragédies, vol. 8, 2e part. Fragments. De Bellérophon à Protésilas; Greek text and French translation by François Jouan and Herman Van Looy; Paris, Les Belles Lettres, 2000, 2002, 2003.

Studies
 N. Wecklein, Tragödien des Euripides: Bellerophontes, 98-109, SBAW, 1888
 A. Caputi Euripide e le sue tragedie sul mito di Bellerofonte, 509-515, RAL, 1909
 M. Pohlenz, Die Grichische Tragödie, I pages 290-293 and II 123-124, Göttingen, 1954
 Z. V. Vykozy, De Euripidis Bellerophonte, pages 137-145, ZJFK, 1963. This Czech essay was translated into German in BCO, 358, 1964.
 A. Carlini, Due note euripidee, 201-205, SCO, 1965
 P. Rau, Paratragœdia, 89-91, Munich, 1967
 Lamberto Di Gregorio, Il Bellerofonte di Euripide. I. Dati per una ricostruzione; II. Tentativa di ricostruzione, 195-214 and 365-382, CCC, 1983
 Christoph Riedweg, The "atheistic" fragment from Euripides "Bellerophontes", 39-53, ICS, 1990
 Mariarita Paterlini, Note al Bellerofonte euripideo, 513-523, Sileno, 1990.

Plays by Euripides
Lost plays
Plays based on classical mythology